The office of Mayor of Prague was established in 1784. In that year, under Joseph II, the four previously independent neighbouring communities of Malá Strana, Nové Město, Staré Město, and Hradčany were merged into a single entity.

Since 1945, the mayor resides and presides in the New City Hall (on Mariánské Square), completed in 1911.

Burgomasters of the Royal City of Prague (1784–1882)

Mayors of the Royal City of Prague (1882–1918)

Mayors of Prague (1918–present)

References

External links